The 1968 West Virginia gubernatorial election took place on November 5, 1968, to elect the governor of West Virginia.

Democratic primary

Candidates
William A. Lawson
Paul J. Kaufman, State Senator from Charleston
C. Donald Robertson, West Virginia Attorney General
James Marshall Sprouse, attorney
Blair F. Winans

Results

Republican primary

Candidates
Peter Beter, former general counsel for the Export–Import Bank of the United States and supporter of George Wallace
E.C. Cales
Arch A. Moore, Jr., U.S. Representative
Cecil H. Underwood, academic and former Governor

Results

General election

Results by county

References

1968
gubernatorial
West Virginia
November 1968 events in the United States